"The Twelfth of Never" is a popular song written in 1956 and first recorded by Johnny Mathis the following year. The title is a popular expression, which is used as the date of a future occurrence that will never come to pass. In the case of the song, "the 12th of Never" is given as the date on which the singer will stop loving his beloved, thus indicating that he will always love her.

Mathis initially disliked the song, which was released as the flip side to his number 1 hit single "Chances Are".

It was written by Jerry Livingston and Paul Francis Webster, the tune (except for the bridge) being adapted from "The Riddle Song" (also known as "I Gave My Love a Cherry"), an old English folk song. Mathis's original version reached number 9 on what is now called the Billboard Hot 100 in the USA in 1957. A version by Cliff Richard was released in 1964 and reached number 8 in the UK. Donny Osmond's version, produced by Mike Curb and Don Costa, was his second number 1 single in the UK, spending a single week at the top of the UK Singles Chart in March 1973. In the U.S. it peaked at number 8.

Chart performance
Johnny Mathis original

Cliff Richard version

Donny Osmond version

Certifications
Donny Osmond version

Notable cover versions
1963: Nina Simone recorded her version on her album  Folsky Nina.
1970: Tammy Wynette recorded her version on her album The Ways to Love a Man.
1977ː David Houston on his album David Houston (single, reached #98 on US Billboard Country chart)
1989: Olivia Newton-John on her 1989 album Warm and Tender.
1993: Jeff Buckley: performed and recorded at his live performance and album Live at Sin-é
1995: Elvis Presley: a rehearsal recorded in 1974 was released as a single and reached #21 in the UK.
2005: Dolly Parton and Keith Urban on Parton's album Those Were the Days
2018: Jan Rot did a version in Dutch on his album Magistraal, the non-existing date translated as '30 Februari'.

References
Notes

Works cited

1957 singles
1969 singles
1973 singles
Songs written by Jerry Livingston
Songs with lyrics by Paul Francis Webster
Andy Williams songs
Johnny Mathis songs
The Chi-Lites songs
Cliff Richard songs
Donny Osmond songs
Barry Gibb songs
Cher songs
Oliver (singer) songs
Tammy Wynette songs
Olivia Newton-John songs
Dolly Parton songs
Keith Urban songs
Elvis Presley songs
Glen Campbell songs
Barry Manilow songs
UK Singles Chart number-one singles
1956 songs
MGM Records singles
Columbia Records singles
Song recordings produced by Norrie Paramor
Columbia Graphophone Company singles
David Houston (singer) songs
1950s ballads